The 1967 World Table Tennis Championships women's doubles was the 28th edition of the women's doubles championship.
Saeko Hirota and Sachiko Morisawa defeated Noriko Yamanaka and Naoko Fukatsu in the final by three sets to nil.

Results

See also
List of World Table Tennis Championships medalists

References

-
1967 in women's table tennis